Brian Gottfried and Raúl Ramírez were the defending champions but only Gottfried competed that year with Victor Amaya.

Amaya and Gottfried lost in the second round to Martin Davis and Chris Dunk.

Bernard Mitton and Butch Walts won in the final 5–7, 6–3, 6–2 against Scott Davis and Ferdi Taygan.

Seeds
The top four seeded teams received byes into the second round.

Draw

Finals

Top half

Bottom half

References
 1984 Congoleum Classic Doubles Draw

Congoleum Classic Doubles